Ao Prof. Dr. Bernhard Lendl is an Austrian chemist, TU Vienna, Institute of Chemical Technologies and Analytics, the head of the working group on Process Analysis & Vibrational Spectroscopy.  Since 2001 he is professor of analytical chemistry, TU Vienna.

His interests include infrared and Raman spectroscopy lab-on-a-chip systems.

Recognition
 2002: Fritz Pregl Prize, Austrian Academy of Sciences
 2003: Fritz Feigl Prize of the Austrian Society of Analytical Chemistry
2011:  FACSS Innovation Award (shared with colleagues) for the paper, C. Koch, M. Brandstetter, S. Radel, and B.Lendl, "Ultrasound Enhanced ATR mid-IR Fibre Optic Probe for Spectroscopy of Particles in Suspensions," which presented a new method for online monitoring of fermentation based on mid-infrared spectroscopy.
2011: Society for Applied Spectroscopy Fellows Award

References

Year of birth missing (living people)
Living people
Austrian chemists